The World Figure Skating Championships is an annual figure skating competition sanctioned by the International Skating Union in which figure skaters compete for the title of World Champion.

The 1958 competitions for men, ladies, pair skating, and ice dancing took place from February 13 to 15 in Paris, France.

It was the first time that a team from the Soviet Union entered the competition.

Results

Men

Judges:
 Alexey Andrianov 
 P. Baron 
 E. Fenner 
 Martin Felsenreich 
 Nigel Sephens 
 B. Srbová 
 Harold G. Storke 
 E. Usemann 
 J. Wilson

Ladies

Judges:
 P. Gross 
 Oscar Madl 
 G. D. Jeffery 
 Gérard Rodriguez-Henriques 
 Pamela Davis 
 Bruno Bonfiglio 
 E. Fenner 
 Emil Skákala 
 M. Drake

Pairs

Judges:
 Alexey Andrianov 
 Bruno Bonfiglio 
 Pamela Davis 
 Martin Felsenreich 
 Metlewicz-Dabrowska 
 Nigel Sephens 
 Emil Skákala 
 Harold G. Storke 
 E. Usemann

Ice dancing

Judges:
 O. L. Borrajo 
 L. Drake 
 B. M. Haanappel 
 G. D. Jeffery 
 Hans Meixner 
 J. Meudec 
 Emil Skákala 
 Hermann Schiechtl 
 C. Somasca-Bianchi

Sources
 Result List provided by the ISU

World Figure Skating Championships
World Figure Skating Championships
World Figure Skating Championships
International figure skating competitions hosted by France
World Figure Skating Championships
World Figure Skating Championships
International sports competitions hosted by Paris